Sankt Urban is a town in the district of Feldkirchen in the Austrian state of Carinthia.

Geography

Nature

Dobra Moor 
The Dobra moor (also called Jakobi or Freundsamer moor) is located at an altitude of 902 m above sea level. Surrounded by numerous gently rolling hills, such as the Gößeberg, Paulsberg and Illmitzer forest, it boasts a rich plant life which is typical of moors. This bog hosts a rare kind of Nordic Birch, a relic from the ice age which was first discovered in Carinthia in 1922.

Neighboring municipalities

References

Cities and towns in Feldkirchen District